WIN-T may refer to:

WANE-TV, a television station
Warfighter Information Network-Tactical, A U.S. Army communications network

See also
 WINT (disambiguation)